Bathurst Airport  is located  west northwest of Bathurst, New Brunswick, Canada in South Tetagouche. It is listed as an airport of entry and can accept general aviation aircraft with up to 15 occupants.

Air Canada, the only airline operating scheduled passenger flights from the airport, indefinitely suspended all operation at Bathurst Airport in June 2020 due to the financial impact of the COVID-19 pandemic in Canada.  Thrice-weekly service to ZBF from Montreal resumed on June 1, 2021.

Airlines and destinations

References

External links

Official website

Certified airports in New Brunswick
Transport in Bathurst, New Brunswick
Buildings and structures in Bathurst, New Brunswick